Landen Stadium (previously Gabbie Stadium, Fairfax Community Stadium, Lily Homes Stadium, Lily's Football Centre, Blacktown City Sports Centre), is a multi-purpose stadium located in Sydney, Australia. It is the home ground of Blacktown City FC. The stadium has a capacity crowd of 7,500 and is owned by Momento Hospitality.

History
The stadium over the years has been used for soccer. 

The venue has been originally known as Gabbie Stadium until naming rights deals with Fairfax Community Newspapers in 2007 settled on the name of Fairfax Community Stadium. In 2009, it was renamed Lily Homes Stadium. In 2014 it, was renamed Lily's Football Centre, in 2020 in was renamed Blacktown City Sports Centre, in 2023 it was renamed Landen Stadium.

References

External links
Official Blacktown City website 
Gabbie Stadium at Austadiums

Soccer venues in Sydney
Rugby league stadiums in Australia
Rugby union stadiums in Australia
Sports venues in Sydney
Sports venues completed in 1979
Blacktown City FC
Multi-purpose stadiums in Australia